Rauði krossinn has its headquarters in Reykjavík.

External links
Icelandic Red Cross - IFRC

Red Cross and Red Crescent national societies
Medical and health organizations based in Iceland